Ligat Nashim (lit. Women's League) is the Israeli women's football league. It has been run by the Israel Football Association since 1998.

Format
The league is divided into two divisions, with the top division, titled Women's Premier League (previously Ligat Nashim Rishona, lit. "First Women's League"), comprising 9 teams, and the second division, titled Women's Leumit League (previously Ligat Nashim Shniya, lit. "Second Women's League"), comprising a variable number of teams, depending on registration. In 2015, a third division was created, named Mama-Foot League (meaning: a football league for mothers) at first, and changed to Women's Artzit League in 2016. The third division is contested in smaller pitches, over two-halves of 15 minutes each and with unlimited substitutions and the winner does not promote to the second division.

Between 2007–08 and 2010–11 the league was made of one division of 12 teams in a round-robin tournament with the top club winning the championship, with a deciding play-off match to decide the winner if the two teams were tied, as was the case in 2009–10. In 2010–11 the IFA re-introduced a second division that previously existed in 2006–07.

Since 2011, the participating clubs first play a conventional round-robin schedule, followed by a championship playoff contested by the four top teams, where they meet each other twice. Upon its conclusion, the first place team wins the Israeli championship and qualifies to participate in the UEFA Women's Champions League. The bottom teams play each other once to avoid relegation, with the bottom club dropping to the second division.
The second division is played as a double round-robin schedule, each team playing its opponents four times, with the top club promoting to the top division.

Champions
A women's football league was organized in late 1998 and started playing during October 1998. In 2003–04 the league was abandoned in mid-season and was never completed.

Total championships

References

External links
Ligat Nashim Rishona Israel Football Association
women.soccerway.com; Standings & results

 
Football leagues in Israel
Women's football in Israel
Isr
Professional sports leagues in Israel